Hexacene is an aromatic compound consisting of six linearly-fused benzene rings. It is a blue-green, air-stable solid with low solubility.

Hexacene is one of a series of linear polycyclic molecules created by such aromatic ring fusions, a series termed acenes—the previous in the series being pentacene (with five fused rings) and the next being heptacene (with seven). It and other acenes and their derivatives have been investigated in potential applications related to organic semiconductors.  Like larger acenes, hexacene is poorly soluble, but derivatives have been prepared with improved solubility. 6,15-Bis(tri-t-butylsilylethynyl)hexacene, which melts with decomposition at 96 °C.

Syntheses and structure
Hexacene has been the subject of many syntheses. One route entails by thermal decarbonylation of monoketone precursor.

Further reading
First synthesis: 
Marschalk, C. Linear hexacenes. Bull. Soc. Chim. Fr. 6, 1112–1121 (1939).

By dehydrogenation of hexacosahydrohexacene by palladium on carbon
Isolation: 
By decarbonylation of a diketone precursor:
Deoxygenation route:

External links
  Molecular graphics representation of the X-ray crystallographic structure determined for 6,15-bis(tri-t-butylsilylethynyl)hexacene—hexacene with bulky, protective substituents in the reactive 6- and 15- ring positions, see rotating graphic at base of page.
 Sander-Wise Polycyclic Aromatic Hydrocarbon Structure Index entry for hexacene, NIST Special Publication 922.

References

Organic semiconductors
Acenes
Polycyclic aromatic hydrocarbons